Koçyazı may refer to one of the following places:

Koçyazı, Feke, Adana Province, Turkey
Koçyazı, Yunak, Konya Province, Turkey
Koçyazı, Düzce, Düzce Province, Turkey